Molecules is a peer-reviewed open access scientific journal that focuses on all aspects of chemistry and materials science. It was established in March 1996 and is published monthly by MDPI. From 1997 to 2001, Molbank was published as a section of the journal, before splitting into its own journal. The editor-in-chief is Farid Chemat.

Molecules was initially published by Springer-Verlag. In December 1996, Shu-Kun Lin resigned as editor and relaunched the journal with Molecular Diversity Preservation International (MDPI). Springer initially sued over naming rights, but eventually dropped the suit.

Abstracting and indexing
The journal is abstracted and indexed in:

According to the Journal Citation Reports, the journal has a 2021 impact factor of 4.927.

References

External links 

 

Chemistry journals
Open access journals
Publications established in 1996
MDPI academic journals
Monthly journals
English-language journals